The Hand is a 1960 British horror film directed by Henry Cass and written by Ray Cooney and Tony Hilton. The film is memorable for its nightmarish premise and opening scene that belies its censorship certificate.

Plot
The story begins during the Burma campaign (mislabeled as '1946'), in which three captured British soldiers are threatened with torture if they refuse to divulge military information. Two refuse and have their hands chopped off.

Some time later, in post-War London, a gentleman of the night is found with his hand surgically removed and £500 in his pockets. This begins a criminal investigation, returning the plot to the opening situation.

Cast
 Derek Bond as Roberts / Roger Crawshaw 
 Ronald Leigh-Hunt as Inspector Munyard 
 Ray Cooney as Sgt. David Pollitt
 Reed De Rouen as Michael John Brodie 
 Bryan Coleman as George Adams 
 Walter Randall as Japanese commander 
 Tony Hilton as Police Sgt. Paul Foster 
 Harold Scott as Charlie Taplow 
 Gwenda Ewen as Nurse Johns 
 Michael Moore as Dr. Metcalfe 
 Ronald Wilson as Doctor 
 Garard Green as Dr. Simon Crawshaw
 Jean Dallas as Nurse Geiber  
 David Blake Kelly as Jay Marshall  
 Reginald Hearne as Noel Brodie
 Madeleine Burgess as Mrs. Brodie

Critical reception
Britmovie wrote, "this Ray Cooney scripted post-war revenge thriller opens promisingly enough but soon all tension and mystery is lost due to the predictable plot development and clumsy editing" ; while Unseen Films wrote, "this is a neat little film that never fully makes 100% sense...I liked this movie a great deal. It's far from perfect, but it does hold your attention."

References

External links
 

1960 films
British horror films
Films directed by Henry Cass
1960 horror films
Films shot at Nettlefold Studios
1960s English-language films
1960s British films